The women's freestyle sprint cross-country skiing competition in the free technique at the 2014 Sochi Olympics took place on 11 February at Laura Biathlon & Ski Complex.

Qualification

An athlete with a maximum of 100 FIS distance points (the A standard) will be allowed to compete in both or one of the event (sprint/distance). An athlete with a maximum 120 FIS sprint points will be allowed to compete in the sprint event and 10 km for women or 15 km for men provided their distance points do not exceed 300 FIS points. NOC's who do not have any athlete meeting the A standard can enter one competitor of each sex (known as the basic quota) in only 10 km classical event for women or 15 km classical event for men. They must have a maximum of 300 FIS distance points at the end of qualifying on 20 January 2014. The qualification period began in July 2012.

Results
 Q — qualified for next round
 LL — lucky loser
 PF — photo finish

In November 2017, Yevgeniya Shapovalova, and later Natalya Matveyeva and Anastasia Dotsenko were disqualified from the event. In January 2018,  Shapovalova and Matveyeva successfully appealed against the lifetime ban as well as decision to disqualify them from Sochi Olympics at the court of arbitration for sport. The disqualification of Dotsenko was upheld.

Qualifying

Quarterfinals
Quarterfinal 1

Quarterfinal 2

Quarterfinal 3

Quarterfinal 4

Quarterfinal 5

Semifinals
Semifinal 1

Semifinal 2

Final
The final was held at 17:29.

References

Women's cross-country skiing at the 2014 Winter Olympics
Women's individual sprint cross-country skiing at the Winter Olympics